Planorboidea is a superfamily of air-breathing freshwater snails, aquatic pulmonate gastropod mollusks.

All of the gastropods in this superfamily are sinistral in shell coiling.

The monophyly of Planorboidea was confirmed by Albrecht et al. (2007).

Thjs superfamily has now been recognised as a synonym of Lymnaeoidea Rafinesque, 1815.

References

Panpulmonata
Taxa named by Constantine Samuel Rafinesque